Roman Chmelo (born 9 September 1980) is a Slovak footballer. He mainly plays as midfielder. He played for Arema in Indonesia and FK DAC 1904 Dunajská Streda which is one of the biggest team in the Slovakian League.

Honours

Club honors
 Champion of Indonesia Super League: Arema Indonesia (2009–10)

References

External links
  Roman Chmelo exclusive interview: closer with "Kicsi"
 Roman Chmelo, between Sharon Stone, Rawon and AC/DC

1980 births
Living people
Slovak footballers
FC DAC 1904 Dunajská Streda players
Expatriate footballers in Indonesia
Liga 1 (Indonesia) players
Expatriate footballers in Malaysia
Slovak expatriate sportspeople in Malaysia
Association football midfielders
Slovak expatriate sportspeople in Indonesia